The BB&T Center is a  high-rise in Charlotte, North Carolina. Completed in 1975, it consists of 22 floors, a 11-story parking garage, and on the second floor it is connected to neighboring buildings via skybridges, as part of the Overstreet Mall.

History
The idea of Southern National Bank creating the building was first announced in December 1970.  Earlier in the year Southern National had acquired Bank of Charlotte which gave them 4 100-year buildings on South Tryon.  The bank undertook as $300,000 renovation of one of these buildings. However, the renovation was abandoned when the contractor found that the old brick turned to powder when it was touched.  Southern National determined that none of the 4 buildings could be renovated.  When the Charlotte Observer reported on this Dewey D. Godfrey, executive vice president in charge of local operations, told the newspaper the bank still had not decided to build.  However, he said this about the success of a new building "I bet we could rent it all out tomorrow, if we were definitely going to build."

Originally the building was intended to be 13 stories. The project doubled from $13 to $26 million. Part of the expansion was adding office space to floors 11 to 13 by building above the parking garage. This allowed Southern Bell to locate departments together on floors within the building. The company's space in the building allowed them to locate all North Carolina employees in one building.

Rodney Little of Little & Co. said that in 1975, Overstreet Mall, based on a Minneapolis design, was expected to be a big success as concern began about retailers moving to the suburbs. For this reason, Southern National Center did not face a major street, but was intended to be part of a network of bridges between office buildings and major stores such as Belk and Ivey's. Another reason for locating along College Street was the concern Tryon Street would run out of space. However, in the 1980s, the Charlotte City Council decided to limit additional walkways, and the uptown Belk and Ivey's closed by the end of the decade.

Southern National Center was the home to the Charlotte headquarters of Southern Bell from 1975 to 1995. When BellSouth, the successor company to Southern Bell, moved to 16-story BellSouth Plaza in 1995, Little & Co. made plans for a $10 million renovation to attract new tenants. Among the building's problems: most of the floor space had been designed specifically for Southern Bell, and the lobby was on the third floor due to the Overstreet Mall. An advantage was the 1500-space parking deck inside.

The station only employed a few people. However, at the time of signing the lease the company was looking around for a  office to house sales staff, technical, and administrative workers.

NationsBank became Bank of America and in 2001 and 2002 gave up  as part of its operation moved to Gateway Center, leaving  still occupied.

In February 2007, the CIM Group acquired the building for $117 million.  BB&T, Bank of America, Mecklenburg Medical Group and AT&T were the largest tenants at the time of the sale.  Spectrum Properties became the new leasing management company.  

The creation of the new office created 230 new jobs by 2017. The center jobs included design, development, testing and deployment of insurance software. The 13th floor became available as a result of Bank of America vacating 3 floors for a total of  earlier in the year. After the AIG lease  remained available.
     

The building served as the bank's regional headquarters housing many lines of business and a bank branch on the first floor. The line of business housed there include Grandbridge Real Estate, BB&T Investments and BB&T Wealth Management. At the time of their renewal the building was 74% leased.

In June 2017 the building was purchased by Philadelphia-based Arden Group for $148.5 million.  At the time of the sale the building was 80% leased.  When the purchase announced was made, they revealed plans to spend $10 million to renovate the building.  The renovation includes adding stone and porcelain walls and floors to the first and third floors, adding LED lights, and a tenant amenity center with training will be created on the second floor.  The renovations were completed in the third quarter of 2019.  At the time of the announcement  was available in the building.
 
In May 2020 the building's parking deck was sold to Cousins Properties Inc. for $85 million.  The structure is 11-stories and has 1,520 spaces.

In January 2021 the building was sold for $115m to BB&T Properties LLC. The Arden Group acquisition in 2017 for $148 million included the parking deck. However, only the building was sold in 2021. The other tenants include AIG, TekSystems, Aerotek, and Ring Central.

In November 2021 Truist Financial announced it will be closing their branch in the building by mid February 2022.  It stated it plans to open a branch on the ground level of Truist Center.  In November 2021 the branch employees were the only Truist employees left in the building.  The bank is leasing  until 2026 that it will be opting to sublease.   The building had served as BB&T's regional headquarters prior to the BB&T and SunTrust merger.

See also
 List of tallest buildings in Charlotte

References

Office buildings in Charlotte, North Carolina
Office buildings completed in 1975